Joseph J. Solomon Jr. (born 1983) is an American politician and Democratic member of the Rhode Island House of Representatives, representing the 22nd District since 2015. This district includes the city of Warwick, where he has lived for his entire life. He is a member of the House Committee on Corporations, the House Committee on Oversight, and the House Veterans' Affairs Committee. He is a member of the Rhode Island Bar Association and is a lawyer.

Elections 
 2014 Solomon ran to represent the 22nd District as Frank Ferri was retiring to run for Lieutenant Governor of Rhode Island. He beat Jennifer Siciliano in the Democratic Primary on September 9, 2014, winning 60.7% of the votes. He then beat Republican Ralph Leone in the General election on November 4, 2014 with 64.4% of the vote.
 2016 Solomon again faced Jennifer Siciliano in the Democratic Primary on September 13, 2016, and he won with 59.14% of the vote. Then he faced Independent Elizabeth Smith in the General election on November 8, 2016. He won that election with 64.36% of the vote.

References 

1984 births
Democratic Party members of the Rhode Island House of Representatives
Living people
21st-century American politicians
Providence College alumni
Politicians from Warwick, Rhode Island
Rhode Island lawyers